Blood Runs Cold is a 2011 Swedish slasher film directed by Sonny Laguna, starring , Patrick Saxe, Andreas Rylander,  and .

Cast
  as Winona
 Patrick Saxe as Rick
 Andreas Rylander as Carl
  as Liz
  as James

Release
The film was released on DVD in the United Kingdom on 3 October 2011. In the United States, the film was released in selected theatres on 22 March 2013, and was released on Cable VOD and for digital download on 26 March. The film was released on DVD in the United States on 2 July.

Reception
Jeremy Blitz of DVD Talk wrote the film a positive review, writing that the film is "a standard "beautiful people in jeopardy" movie, doesn't make a lot of sense, and is fairly close to plotless", it "is a lot of fun, with great gore, decent tension and plenty of scares." Aaron Williams of Dread Central gave the film a score of 3 out of 5, calling it "short, sharp and nasty low budget slasher fun".

Craig McGee of HorrorNews.net wrote the film a mixed review, writing, "I’m very impressed with how it looked for having so little money to throw at it, this much is true and that much good I can indeed say about it so I won’t break out too much harsh sarcasm and trash it to death", but that it "made the cardinal sin of almost consistently boring me with its story, characters, and lack of imagination leading to the BAM abrupt ending."

Ian Sedensky of Culture Crypt gave the film a score of 40 out of 100, writing that the film "is just a frame to showcase a few bloody kills while one maniac chases around interchangeable victims". Rod Lott of the Oklahoma Gazette wrote a negative review of the film, writing that it is "as routine as it is gory".

References

External links
 
 

2011 films
Swedish slasher films
2010s slasher films
2010s Swedish films